Amrut Rao (c. 1770 – 1824) was a Maratha noble, and the adopted son of Peshwa Raghunath Rao. In 1803, Yashwant Rao Holkar invaded Pune and deposed his adoptive brother Peshwa Baji Rao II. Subsequently, Holkar set up an ad hoc council nominally headed by Amrut Rao, and ran the Peshwa's government in his name. Holkar also installed Amrut Rao's son Vinayak Rao as the Peshwa to strengthen the legal status of his government, because Vinayak had been adopted by the widow of the deceased Peshwa Madhav Rao II. However, Baji Rao sought assistance from the British East India Company, whose advance forced Amrut Rao and his son to flee Pune. Subsequently, Amrut Rao signed a treaty with the British, agreeing to give up all claims over the Peshwa's office in return for a pension and an estate in Bundelkhand.

Early life 
Amrut Rao was born around 1770. He was adopted by Raghunath Rao, the Maratha Peshwa who allied with the British East India Company in 1775. However, the British later signed the Treaty of Salbai (1782) with Raghunath's rivals among the Marathas, and acknowledged Madhav Rao II as the Peshwa. Raghunath Rao died a year later in 1783, and his family was kept in confinement by the Peshwa's minister Nana Fadnavis. His wife Anandi Bai, his sons Baji Rao II and Chimaji Rao II, and his adopted son Amrut Rao were all kept imprisoned at Kopargaon until 1793. Subsequently, they were moved to Anandwali (in Nashik), and in April 1794, they were confined to the Shivneri fort. After the death of Peshwa Madhav Rao II, Nana Fadnavis and the powerful nobleman Daulat Rao Scindia installed Amrut Rao's adoptive brothers — first Chimaji Rao and then Baji Rao II — as titular Peshwas in quick succession. After Fadnavis' death, Daulat Rao Scindia held the actual power, while Baji Rao II was a puppet Peshwa.

Conflict with Daulat Rao Scindia 
The widows of Daulat Rao Scindia's predecessor Mahadji Scindia fought with him for control of the Scindia court. In 1798, Scindia decided to transfer the widows to Ahmednagar, and keep them in confinement there. However, Muzaffar Khan, an officer loyal to the ladies, rescued them near Koregaon Bhima, when Scindia's men were moving them to Ahmednagar. Khan took the widows to Amrut Rao, who happened to be near Koregaon Bhima. Amrut Rao granted them protection.

On the night of 7 June 1798, Scindia sent five infantry battalions under the command of a French officer — Captain Du Prat, to retrieve the widows. However, Amrut Rao's army forced Scindia's men to retreat. Scindia then started negotiations, offering the ladies a chance to select their residence. Amrut Rao arrived near Pune to meet Scindia on behalf of the ladies. He set up his camp on the banks of the Mula river, near the Khadki bridge. Scindia's father-in-law and general Sarji Rao Ghatge (also known as Sarjerao) led two battalions to the riverside, on the pretext of maintaining order at the local Muharram procession. But his men opened fire at Amrut Rao's camp, with 25 cannons. As Amrut Rao's troops dispersed, Ghatge's force attacked them and pillaged their camp. The widows then fled to Kolhapur.

Holkar's occupation of Pune 
On 25 October 1802, Daulat Rao Scindia's rival noble Yashwant Rao Holkar invaded Pune, defeating the joint forces of Scindia and Peshwa Baji Rao II, in the Battle of Hadapsar. After taking control of Pune, Holkar decide to install a titular Peshwa at Pune. While the office of the Peshwa no longer held the actual power, an act of dislodging the Peshwa would be met with opposition by other Maratha nobles. Therefore, Holkar sent for Baji Rao's brother Amrut Rao, who was in Junnar. Amrut Rao arrived in Pune with his son Vinayak Rao, who had been adopted by Yasoda Bai, the widow of Baji Rao II's predecessor Peshwa Madhav Rao II. Holkar set up an ad hoc council headed by Amrut Rao, and ran the Peshwa's government in his name. He also attempted to give a legal status to his new government at Pune by appointing Vinayak Rao as the new Peshwa.

On 13 March 1803, Holkar left Pune, leaving Amrut Rao with 1,000 soldiers. Meanwhile, Baji Rao II had fled to Vasai, and had sought assistance from the British. Yashwant Rao Holkar and Amrut Rao unsuccessfully tried to obtain British support for their government. But the British signed the Treaty of Bassein with Baji Rao on 31 December 1802. In 1803, the British dispatched an army led by Arthur Wellesley to capture Pune and restore Baji Rao II as the titular Peshwa under British authority. Amrut Rao was forced to flee Pune with Holkar's men. As Wellesley advanced towards Pune, he received news that Amrut Rao had plundered the city, and that Holkar had ordered his general to burn down the city before leaving it. However, by the time he reached the city on 20 April 1803, he found the city to be safe. The British restored Baji Rao II as a titular Peshwa on 13 May 1803, this time under British control.

After fleeing Pune 
Holkar had left his European officer William Linnæus Gardner as a liaison officer (actually a spy) in Amrut Rao's camp. After being forced to flee from Pune, Amrut Rao felt betrayed by Holkar, who had left him with a small force against the mighty British. As a result, Amrut Rao imprisoned Gardner. Subsequently, he summoned Gardner and suggested that they both join Holkar's rival Scinda, with Gardner serving as a trainer for Amrut Rao's soldiers. Gardner laughed at the proposal, which enraged Amrut Rao. At one point, Amrut Rao's soldiers bound him to the muzzle of a cannon. However, they did not actually execute him, since he was a valuable prisoner: as one of Holkar's best officers, he could be offered to Scindia. While Amrut Rao was on his way to meet Scindia, Gardner managed to escape from his custody.

Meanwhile, the British general Arthur Wellesley opened correspondence with Amrut Rao. Wellesley saw him as a valuable ally, who could turn into a dangerous opponent if antagonized. Amrut Rao had joined Holkar reluctantly, and saw little sense in fighting against the British. Consequently, the two parties decided to negotiate, although Peshwa Baji Rao II considered Amrut Rao his enemy and was not happy with the rapprochement. On 14 August 1803, Amrut Rao signed an agreement with the British. He agreed to abandon all claims over the Peshwa's office and to remain friendly with the British. In return, he would receive an annual pension of  7 lakhs annually from the Company with a jagir in Banda district. He took up his residence at Karwi. He and his descendants governed the Tiroha (Kirur) estate of the Bundelkhand Agency. There, he became well known for his religiousness and charity. He once freed all the persons imprisoned in Benares for debt, by paying off their debts.

Amrut Rao died on 6 September 1824, at Secrole near Benares. His son and successor Vinayak Rao died childless in 1853. Vinayak's adopted sons Narayana Rao and Madho joined the 1857 uprising after the Company ceased their pension. The revolt was crushed: Narayan Rao died a prisoner, while Madho Rao was allowed to remain a landlord in consideration of his young age at the time of the uprising. Narayan Rao's daughter was awarded a state in Banda and Chitrakoot on the guarantees of Sindhiya and Holkar.

References 

Peshwa dynasty
Year of birth unknown
1824 deaths
Year of birth uncertain